Thinkers Newspaper is a daily online-based newspaper based in Abuja, Nigeria. Thinkers Newspaper is published by Thinkers Communications Limited, established in 2008 in Abuja, Nigeria.

Thinkers Newspaper a sister publication of the monthly Thinkers Magazine .

History
Thinkers Newspaper is a daily online-based newspaper based in Abuja, Nigeria. Thinkers Newspaper is published by Thinkers Communications Limited, established in 2008 in Abuja, Nigeria.

Thinkers Newspaper a sister publication of the monthly Thinkers Magazine.

Content
The newspaper has an online edition and its content are republished. It has an Annual Lecture and Awards ceremony instituted to recognise individuals and institutions in the public and private sector that have made outstanding contributions in their various fields of endeavour.

Personnel 
The founder is Abdullahi G. Mohammed, a media entrepreneur, politician farmer. The Chairman/CEO is Malam Abubakar Ibrahim, the Dallatun Lafia, the capital of Nasarawa state, North-Central, Nigeria.

References

External links
 Official Website

Mass media in Abuja